Epacris graniticola, commonly known as granite heath,<ref name="dpipwe">{{cite web |title=Epacris graniticola |url=https://nre.tas.gov.au/Documents/Epacris-graniticola.pdf |publisher=Tasmanian Government Department of Primary Industries, Parks, Water and the Environment |access-date=28 May 2022}}</ref> is a species of flowering plant in the heath family Ericaceae and is endemic to Tasmania. It is an erect shrub with egg-shaped leaves and tube-shaped white flowers mostly clustered near the ends of branches.

Taxonomy and namingEpacris graniticola was first formally described in 1995 by R.K.Crowden in the journal Muelleria from specimens he collected on Mount Cameron in 2003. The specific epithet (graniticola) means "granite dweller".

Distribution and habitat
Granite heath is only known from a few populations in mountainous areas of north-east Tamania, where it grows in moist places in the shade of granite outcrops.

Conservation statusEpacris graniticola is listed as "critically endangered" under the Australian Government Environment Protection and Biodiversity Conservation Act 1999 and the Tasmanian Government Threatened Species Protection Act 1995. The main threats to the species are inappropriate fire regimes, disease caused by Phytophthora cinnamomi'' and mining activities.

References

graniticola
Ericales of Australia
Flora of Tasmania
Plants described in 2007
Endemic flora of Australia